Eun Won-jae (born July 21, 1994) is a South Korean actor.

Filmography

Film

Television series

Awards and nominations

References

External links
  
 
 
 

1994 births
Living people
South Korean male film actors
South Korean male television actors
South Korean male child actors